Constantin Bosianu (10 February 1815, Bucharest – 21 March 1882, Bucharest) was a Romanian jurist and politician, honorary member of the Romanian Academy, Prime Minister of Romania from 26 January to 14 June 1865. He was the first dean of the Bucharest Faculty of Law.

Then, he acts as an MP, and at the same time he is Dean of the Ilfov Bar (1871 - 1873). By the end of his life, Bosianu served as  an acting mayor of Bucharest for two weeks in December 1878, and between May 29 and November 15, 1879, Constantin Bosianu was elected the Chairman  of the Senate.

Biography
He studied at the prestigious school of Saint Sava. He worked in government, was the head of the public control chamber of the Department of Finance. After receiving a state scholarship, he continued his studies in Antwerp and Paris, where in 1844 he received a degree in literature at the Sorbonne and a PhD in law in 1851.

Returning to his homeland, he became a professor of Roman Law, then a professor of accountancy at the Central School of Agriculture and director of the Department of Justice. Engaged in social and political activities. As a member of the Electoral Assembly of Wallachia, on January 24, 1859, he voted to elect Alexandru Ioan Cuza to the throne of Romania. Later he was appointed a judge of the Supreme Court.

In 1864 he became vice-president of the State Council of the United Principality of Wallachia and Moldova.

Constantin Bosianu died on March 21, 1882, at the age of 67.

Note

1815 births
1882 deaths
Politicians from Bucharest
People of the Principality of Wallachia
Prime Ministers of Romania
Romanian Ministers of Interior
Romanian Ministers of Agriculture
Romanian Ministers of Public Works
Presidents of the Senate of Romania
Romanian jurists
Honorary members of the Romanian Academy
Academic staff of the University of Bucharest
Romanian university and college faculty deans